The Rt Rev  Percival William Stephenson  was the 6th Anglican bishop of Nelson whose episcopate spanned a 14-year period in the mid-20th century.

Family
The son of  Arthur Henry Stephenson (1867-1955), and Annie Amelia Vevers Stephenson (1865-1903), née Brailey, Percival William Stephenson was born at Malmsbury, Victoria  on 5 May 1888.

He married Grace Ermyntrude Lavender (1885-1974) on 9 October 1913. They three children, Millicent Lavender Stephenson (1914-), Arthur Lavender Stephenson (1917-2001), and Noel Lavender Stephenson (1920-). Percival Stephenson died in 1962.

Education
He was educated at Caulfield Grammar School, Melbourne, where he was an outstanding footballer in the school's First XVIII, the University of Melbourne, the Australian College of Theology, and the University of London.
 1912: Bachelor of Arts (B.A.) — University of Melbourne.
 1913: Licentiate of Theology (L.Th.) — Australian College of Theology.
 1915: Bachelor of Arts (M.A.) — University of Melbourne.
 1917: Bachelor of Divinity (B.D.) — University of London.

Cleric
He was ordained in 1914.

Academic
He moved to India to teach at CMS Edwards College in Peshawar, where he was initially a teacher and then principal (1921–1924). From 1924 to 1928 he was professor of exegetical theology at St John's College, Winnipeg.

On his return to Australia he became federal secretary of the Church Missionary Society of Australia and Tasmania and headmaster of Trinity Grammar School, Sydney (1935–37) and then commonwealth secretary of the British and Foreign Bible Society until his elevation to the episcopate in 1940.

Death
He died on 29 May 1962.

See also

 List of Caulfield Grammar School people

Notes

References
 Cole, Keith, Sincerity My Guide: A Biography of the Right Reverend P.W. Stephenson (1888-1962), Church Missionary Historical Publications Trust, (Melbourne), 1970. 
 
 

1888 births
People educated at Caulfield Grammar School
University of Melbourne alumni
Academic staff of the University of Manitoba
Anglican bishops of Nelson
20th-century Anglican bishops in New Zealand
1960 deaths
Alumni of the University of London
Australian headmasters